The Stanford Cardinal women's volleyball team represents Stanford University in the Pac-12 Conference. They are currently led by head coach Kevin Hambly and play their home games at Maples Pavilion. The team has won nine NCAA national championships, the most of all time, and 21 regular season conference titles. They have finished as national runner-up eight times and appeared in the first 39 NCAA tournaments, failing to qualify for the postseason for the first time during the 2020–2021 season. In January 2017, John Dunning retired as head coach of Stanford volleyball. The school named Kevin Hambly as the new head coach. Hambly came from the University of Illinois and 2017 was his first season with the Cardinal.

Notable players

Inky Ajanaku – 2016 NCAA Championship Most Outstanding Player
Foluke Akinradewo** – 2007  American Volleyball Coaches Association (AVCA) National Player of the Year, 2012, 2016 indoor volleyball Olympian
Cynthia Barboza
Kristin Folkl**
Jenna Gray—All-Tournament team 2016, 2018, 2019, Honda Sports Award (2019)
Morgan Hentz– All-Tournament team 2016, 2018, 2019, co-most outstanding NCAA tournament player (2018), all-time dig records at Stanford, three time First Team All-American (2017, 2018, 2019).
Kerri Walsh Jennings*** – 1996 Volleyball Magazine Freshman of the Year, 1996 NCAA Championship Most Outstanding Player, 1999 AVCA National Co Player of the Year, 2004, 2008, and 2012 Olympic gold medalist in beach volleyball, 2000 indoor volleyball Olympian
Kristin Klein** – 1996 indoor volleyball Olympian
Alix Klineman** – 2010 Volleyball Magazine Player of the Year, Pac-10 Conference Player of the Year, AVCA National Freshman of the Year, multi AVCA All-American, All-Conference selection all four years, 2007 and 2008 NCAA All-Tournament Team; second at Stanford and fifth all-time in Pac-10 history with 2,008 kills; in 2010 ranked second in the US with 5.55 kills per set and 6.25 points per set.
Ogonna Nnamani** – 2004 AVCA National Co Player of the Year, 2004 NCAA Championship Most Outstanding Player, 2004 Honda-Broderick Cup winner, 2004 and 2008 indoor volleyball Olympian
Beverly Oden*** – 1992 AVCA National Player of the Year, 1996 indoor volleyball Olympian
Kim Oden – 1985 AVCA National Player of the Year, 1988, 1992 indoor volleyball Olympian
Kathryn Plummer – 2016 AVCA National Freshman of the Year, 2017 and 2018 AVCA National Player of the Year, 2018 NCAA Championship Co Most Outstanding Player, 2019 NCAA Championship Most Outstanding Player
Logan Tom*** – 1999 AVCA National Freshman of the Year, 2001 and 2002 AVCA National Player of the Year, 2001 NCAA Championship Most Outstanding Player, 2000, 2004, 2008 and 2012 indoor volleyball Olympian
Cary Wendell – 1995 AVCA National Co Player of the Year

**Four-Time AVCA Division I All-Americans 
***Four-Time AVCA Division I All-American First-Team Selections  
Source:

Season-by-season results 
Stanford has appeared in every NCAA tournament since its inception in 1981 except for the 2020-21 tournament. Stanford has appeared in 17 championship games, and won 9 titles, more than any other team.

* AVCA National Coach of the Year

See also
List of NCAA Division I women's volleyball programs

References

External links